Wowcher Ltd is the second largest British e-commerce deal of the day site in the UK and Ireland.

Description
The site allows subscribers access to products and services from local merchants. It serves 52 cities around the UK and Ireland. Founded in 2009 by Nicholas Brummitt and bought in 2011 by DMG Media, Wowcher currently has a user-base of roughly 10 million members. 
It is a deal of the day sales website similar to Groupon.

Groupon, Wowcher, and Barclaycard’s Bespoke Offers service were growing quickly in the UK online sales market, but the latter two have had their value for money questioned at times in 2014.

Sources

External links

Deal of the day services
Retail companies established in 2009
Android (operating system) software
Windows Phone software
2011 mergers and acquisitions
Online retailers of the United Kingdom